Special Effort (April 9, 1979 – March 11, 2006) was an American Quarter Horse stallion who won the 1981 All American Futurity. He was inducted into the American Quarter Horse Association's (or AQHA) Hall of Fame in 2008.

Life

Special Effort was foaled in 1979 and was bred by Allen and Jeanette Moehrig of Seguin, Texas. He was bought in 1981 by Dan and Jolene Urschel for $1,000,000. He won the 1981 Kansas Futurity, Rainbow Futurity and  the All American Futurity to become a Triple Crown winner. Trained by Johnnie Goodman. In 1982, he won the Kansas Derby and was undefeated 13 for 13 going into the All American Derby, but finished third. He retired from the racetrack to become a sire of racehorses. He died in March 2006. He was syndicated in 1981 for $15 million.

Pedigree

Notes

References

External links
 All Breed Pedigree Database pedigree of Special Effort

American Quarter Horse racehorses
American Quarter Horse sires
1979 racehorse births
2006 racehorse deaths
AQHA Hall of Fame (horses)